Lilian Astier (born 12 August 1978), is a French former professional football player.

Career
Born in Le Puy-en-Velay, Astier had a promising start to his football career. He trained with the youth teams of AS Saint-Étienne, and would make his professional debut with the senior club in Ligue 2. However after failing to break into Saint-Étienne's first team, he was sent with his compatriot Johann Duveau on a short-term loan to play for Burgos CF in Segunda División B. After his loan expired, Saint-Étienne canceled his contract and he attempted to join OGC Nice. However, his contract with Nice wasn't approved by the league.

Outside of two seasons in Ligue 2 with FC Libourne-Saint-Seurin, Astier would spend the remainder of his career playing in the third and fourth level of French football.

Astier won the 1997 UEFA European Under-18 Championship with France.

References

External links

1978 births
Living people
People from Le Puy-en-Velay
French footballers
France youth international footballers
French expatriate footballers
Expatriate footballers in Spain
Ligue 2 players
AS Saint-Étienne players
Burgos CF footballers
Olympique Alès players
FC Libourne players
FC Mulhouse players
AS Béziers (2007) players
Association football defenders
Sportspeople from Haute-Loire
Footballers from Auvergne-Rhône-Alpes